Peet Memorial Training College is located at Mavelikara, in the district of Alapuzha in Kerala, India.

History

Peet Memorial Training College, Mavelikara was founded in 1960 in memory of the Rev. Joseph Peet, who was one of the missionaries, sent by the Church Mission Society to South India. He came to Mavelikara in 1836. He was mainly instrumental in popularising education in the area. The college is governed by a council, constituted by the Diocese of Madhya Kerala of the Church of South India.

Departments
English
Physical Science
Mathematics
Natural Science
Social Science
Commerce

Courses
The college is affiliated to the University of Kerala, accredited by NAAC, recognised by the NCTE and offers a one-year teacher training course leading to the Degree of Bachelor of Education in six  subjects: English, Mathematics, Natural Science, Physical Science, Social Studies and Commerce. Master's degree in Education (M.Ed.) course was started in the college in 2006.

External links
College website
CSI Madhya Kerala Diocese
Kerala University

Colleges of education in India
Colleges in Kerala
Universities and colleges in Alappuzha district
Colleges affiliated to the University of Kerala
Educational institutions established in 1960
1960 establishments in Kerala